Meritz Financial Group Inc. is a financial holding company headquartered in Seoul, South Korea. Meritz Financial, with its major subsidiaries including Meritz Fire & Marine Insurance and Meritz Securities, is one of the major financial groups in South Korea.

History
Meritz Financial Group was formed when Hanjin Group founder Cho Choong-hoon died in 2002. After the founder's death, the group was succeeded by his four sons. Cho Jung-ho, the founder's fourth son, inherited Hanjin's financial arm, including Oriental Fire & Marine Insurance, Meritz Securities, and Korean-French Banking. In 2005, Cho formally broke off the financial affiliates from Hanjin and renamed them Meritz Financial Group. In 2011, Meritz Fire & Marine Insurance launched a financial holding company. It was founded by spinning off a holding company, Meritz Financial Group Inc., from Meritz Fire & Marine Insurance.

Subsidiaries
Meritz Financial Group has five major subsidiaries, including Meritz Fire & Marine Insurance, Meritz Securities, Meritz Asset Management, Meritz Alternative Investment Management, and Meritz Capital.

Meritz Fire & Marine Insurance
Meritz Fire & Marine was established as Chosun Fire & Marine Insurance in 1922 when Korea was under Japanese occupation, with the title of Korea's first general insurer. After Japan's colonial rule, the company became state-owned and was renamed Oriental Fire & Marine in 1950. It was the first insurance company in Korea to be listed on the stock market in 1956. Oriental became a subsidiary of the Hanjin Group in 1967 and broke off from the group in 2005. After the separation, it was renamed Meritz Fire & Marine Insurance.

See also
 List of largest companies of South Korea

References

External links
 

Financial services companies established in 2011
South Korean companies established in 2011
Companies listed on the Korea Exchange
Hanjin Group